The 14th AVN Awards ceremony, organized by Adult Video News (AVN), took place January 11, 1997 at Riviera Hotel & Casino, Winchester, Nevada, beginning at 7:45 p.m. PST / 10:45 p.m. EST. During the show, AVN presented AVN Awards (the industry's equivalent of the Academy Awards) in 41 categories honoring the best pornographic films released between Oct. 1, 1995 and Sept. 30, 1996. The ceremony was produced by Gary Miller and directed by Mark Stone. Comedian Bobby Slayton returned as host, with actresses Nici Sterling and Kylie Ireland as co-hosts. At a pre-awards event held the previous evening, 60 more AVN Awards, mostly for technical achievements, were given out by hostess Dyanna Lauren and comedy ventriloquist Otto of Otto & George, however, the pre-awards event was neither televised nor distributed on VHS tapes as was the main evening's ceremony.

Shock won the most awards with 11, however, Bobby Sox, an "off-beat period piece comedy" that received six statuettes, won for best film. Flesh and Blood was next with five awards including best gay feature.

Winners and nominees

The winners were announced during the awards ceremony on January 11, 1997. Missy was the first actress to win both Starlet of the Year and the AVN Female Performer of the Year Award in the same year. Kurt Young, however, was second to win the major gay awards in the same year, taking Gay Video Performer of the Year and Best Newcomer.

Major awards

Winners are listed first, highlighted in boldface, and indicated with a double dagger.

Additional award winners

These awards were also announced at the awards show, most in a winners-only segment read by Kylie Ireland during the event:

 Best All-Girl Feature: The Violation of Missy
 Best All-Sex Film: Unleashed
 Best Anal Sex Scene—Film: Lovette and the Six Skeletons (John Decker, Michael J. Cox, Nick East, three others), Gregory Dark's Sex Freaks
 Best Anal Sex Scene—Video: Rocco Siffredi, Laura Turner, Danielle Louise Kelson; Buttman's Bend Over Babes 4
 Best Continuing Video Series: The Voyeur
 Best Director—Gay Video: Jerry Douglas, Flesh and Blood
 Best European Release (the Hot Video Award): Torero (Italy)
 Best Gangbang Tape: Gangbang Girl 17

 Best Gay Video: Flesh and Blood
 Best Group Sex Scene—Film: Christy Canyon, Tony Tedeschi, Vince Vouyer, Steven St. Croix; The Show
 Best Group Sex Scene—Video: (tie) Hakan, Missy, Taren and Alex Sanders, Squirting Anal Orgy scene in American Tushy!; Ruby, Christi Lake, Rocco Siffredi, John Stagliano, Buttman's Bend Over Babes 4
 Best Tease Performance: Janine Lindemulder, Extreme Close-Up
 Gay Video Performer of the Year: Kurt Young
 Most Outrageous Sex Scene: Shayla LaVeaux, T. T. Boy and Vince Vouyer, gargoyle scene in Shock

The previous night, January 10, 1997, during AVN's pre-awards cocktail reception, hostess adult film actress hostess Dyanna Lauren and comedy ventriloquist Otto of Otto & George handed out these awards, mostly for technical excellence:

 Best Advertisement: Changing the Face of Adult, Vivid
 Best Alternative Adult Feature Film: Scoring
 Best Alternative Adult Film Featurette or Specialty Tape: The Best of Anna Nicole Smith
 Best Alternative Adult Video: Buttman at Nudes ‘a Poppin 3
 Best Amateur Series: Filthy First Timers
 Best Amateur Tape: Southern Belles 4
 Best Anal Tape: American Tushy!
 Best Art Direction—Film: Unleashed
 Best Art Direction—Video: Shock
 Best Bisexual Video: Switchhitters VIII
 Best Box Cover Concept: Russian Model Magazine
 Best Box Cover Concept—Gay Video: Night Walk
 Best CD-ROM Graphics/Art Direction: Latex
 Best CD-ROM Photo Disk: Eric Kroll: Fetish
 Best Cinematography: Andrew Blake, Unleashed
 Best Compilation Tape: Sodomania: Smokin' Sextions
 Best Director—Bisexual Video: Gino Colbert, Switchhitters VIII
 Best Editing—Fllm: Barry Rose, Bobby Sox
 Best Editing—Gay Video: Michael Ninn, Night Walk
 Best Editing—Video: Michael Ninn, Shock
 Best Ethnic-Themed Video: Inner City Black Cheerleader Search 6
 Best Explicit Series: Amazing Hard
 Best Featurette Tape: Sodomania 16
 Best Foreign Release: The Pyramid 1–3
 Best Foreign Featurette Tape: Prague by Night
 Best Gay Alternative Video Release: Nighthawken
 Best Gay Solo Video: Brad Posey's Hot Sessions 3
 Best Gay Specialty Release: Orgy Boys 1 & 2
 Best Interactive CD-ROM (Game): 2069: Oriental Sex Odyssey
 Best Interactive CD-ROM (Non-Game): FantaScenes

 Best Music: Dino and Earl Ninn, Shock
 Best Music—Gay Video: Sharon Kane, Idol in the Sky
 Best Newcomer—Gay Video: Kurt Young
 Best Non-Sex Performance, Film or Video: Scotty Schwartz, Silver Screen Confidential
 Best Non-Sexual Role—Bi, Gay or Trans Video: Jeanna Fine, Flesh and Blood
 Best Original CD-ROM Concept: NetErotique
 Best Overall Marketing Campaign for an Individual Title or Series: Conquest, Wicked Pictures
 Best Overall Marketing Campaign for Company Image: Vivid Girl campaign, Vivid Video
 Best Packaging—Film: Chasey Saves the World
 Best Packaging—Gay Video: Idol in the Sky
 Best Packaging—Specialty: Wheel of Obsession
 Best Packaging—Video: XXX
 Best Performer—Gay Video: Kurt Young, Flesh and Blood
 Best Pro-Am Series: Cumm Brothers
 Best Pro-Am Tape: Up and Cummers 33
 Best Screenplay—Film: Raven Touchstone, Bobby Sox
 Best Screenplay—Gay Video: Jerry Douglas, Flesh and Blood
 Best Screenplay—Video: Jace Rocker, Silver Screen Confidential
 Best Sex Scene—Gay Video: Derek Cameron, Kurt Young, Tradewinds
 Best Special Effects: Shock
 Best Specialty Tape—Big Bust: The Duke of Knockers 2
 Best Specialty Tape—Bondage: Kym Wilde's on the Edge 33
 Best Specialty Tape—Other Genre: High Heeled and Horny 4
 Best Specialty Tape—Spanking: Hot Young Asses
 Best Supporting Performer—Gay Video: Dino Phillips, Happily Ever After
 Best Trailer: Conquest
 Best Trans Video: Red Riding She-Male
 Best Videography: Barry Harley, Shock
 Best Videography—Gay Video: Bruce Cam, Desert Train

Honorary AVN Awards

Special Achievement Awards

 Mark Stone and Gary Miller on their 10th anniversary producing the AVN Awards Show
 Berth Milton Jr. and Robert Tremont for their success with Private Video

AVN Breakthrough Award

Presented to Steve Perry for Ben Dover series

Hall of Fame

AVN Hall of Fame inductees for 1997, announced during AVN's pre-awards event, were: Bunny Bleu, R. Bolla, Michael Carpenter, Desiree Cousteau, Duck Dumont, Jeanna Fine, Gail Force, Ken Gibb (posthumously), Victoria Paris, Jeannie Pepper, John Stagliano, Joey Stefano (posthumously), John Travis, Dick Witte

Multiple nominations and awards

Shock won the most awards with 11; Bobby Sox was next with six, followed by gay video Flesh and Blood with five. Buttman's Bend Over Babes 4, Conquest, The Show, Silver Screen Confidential and Unleashed had three apiece. American Tushy! Idol in the Sky, Night Walk and Switchhitters VIII had two each.

Presenters and performers

The following individuals, in order of appearance, presented awards or performed musical numbers or comedy. The show's trophy girls were Midori and Stephanie Swift.

Presenters

Performers

Ceremony information

Comedian Bobby Slayton made a return engagement as host of the show. This year the show was centered around an international theme, “the world of adult,” with added emphasis on European presenters and awards. This was the first year the awards ceremony was split over two nights, with a pre-awards event held January 10, 1997, where awards for technical achievements were distributed, while the main awards were presented January 11, 1997.

Several other people were also involved with the production of the ceremony. Serenity was responsible for choreography and Mark Stone was musical director with original songs by Mark J. Miller.

The top selling and renting tape of the year was Shock, although it was tied in the best-selling category with World's Biggest Gang Bang 2. There were several new awards categories this year including Best Advertisement and the AVN Breakthrough Award to acknowledge "those who were carving new niches and forging new territories in the adult business."

The ceremonies were published on VHS tape by VCA Pictures.

Critical response

The show received a negative reception from Hustler magazine, which said, “Long-winded speeches from several award winners threatened to bore everyone to death.” It went on to add that since AVN is a trade publication paid for by ads "from the same adult video companies it bestows awards upon, the critical value of such honors is subject to debate." Swank Video World magazine was a bit more positive, calling the show "the most glamorous night in the adult industry."

See also

 AVN Award for Best Actress
 AVN Award for Best Supporting Actress
 AVN Award for Male Performer of the Year
 AVN Award for Male Foreign Performer of the Year
 AVN Award for Female Foreign Performer of the Year
 AVN Female Performer of the Year Award
 List of members of the AVN Hall of Fame

Notes

Bibliography

External links
 
 Adult Video News Awards  at the Internet Movie Database
 
 
 
 "1997 AVN Award Winners" and categories at the Internet Archive Wayback Machine

AVN Awards
1997 film awards